Tom Wayland (born July 21, 1973) is an American voice actor, voice director and producer who is the Supervising Director at 3Beep productions, which works on English-language dubs of Japanese anime and other global animations. He previously worked for Central Park Media and 4Kids Entertainment. He founded TripWire Productions, which has produced more than 200 different anime titles and overseen the voice direction of many animation titles. He is also a graduate of NYU's Tisch School of the Arts. He was best known as the voice director for Pokémon, Mew Mew Power, Magical DoReMi, ShootFighter Tekken, G.I. Joe: Sigma 6 and The World of Narue.  He has also worked with related New York studios at DuArt Film and Video, NYAV Post, Real Recording, Matlin Recording, Beatstreet Studios and Audioworks Producers Group.

Filmography

Anime

Animation

Video games

Film

 Alien Nine - Kasumi's Brother
 Chaotic - Drew, Cerbie, Mipedian
 DNA^2 - Kakimaro Someya
 G.I. Joe Sigma 6 - Storm Shadow
 Gall Force - Born (Movies 2–3)
 The Gokusen - Kudo, Additional Voices
 Ichi the Killer - Kaneda
 It's All Elementary - JT
 Kakurenbo - Tachiji
 Kizuna: Bonds of Love - Toshi
 Magical DoReMi - Oliver, Reanne's dad
 Mew Mew Power - R2000/Mini Mew
 Mobile Suit Gundam SEED - Mu La Flaga (NYAV Post dub)
 Mobile Suit Gundam Unicorn - Additional Voices
 Mobile Suit Gundam: The Origin - Mash
 One Piece (4Kids dub) - Chew, Fullbody, Kappa, Lake
 Super 4 - Black Baron
 Tai Chi Chasers - Finn
 Three Delivery - Additional voices
 Weiß Kreuz - Sena Izumi

Live action (Dubbing)
 Adventures in Voice Acting - Himself
 Big Boobs Busters - Eiji Bando
 The Machine Girl - Shinsuke
 The Ninja Dragon - Suzuka Hatai
 The Fifth Dimension - TBD

Production credits

ADR voice direction
 Arcade Gamer Fubuki
 Animation Runner Kuromi 2
 Gall Force 2: Revolution
 Gall Force 3: Destruction
 Ichi the Killer: Episode 0
 Joe vs. Joe
 Kakurenbo: Hide & Seek
 Munto 2: Beyond the Walls
 Negadon: The Monster from Mars
 Magical DoReMi
 Mew Mew Power
 Outlanders (CPM Version)
 Pokémon (TV Series: EP516 - EP864 / Movie Adaptions: from Pokémon: The Rise of Darkrai until Diancie and the Cocoon of Destruction)
 Shootfighter Tekken
 Tales of Seduction
 The Boy Who Wanted to be a Bear

ADR script adaptation
 Alien Nine
 Animation Runner Kuromi 2
 Arcade Gamer Fubuki
 Gall Force 2: Destruction
 Gall Force 3: Stardust War
 Garaga
 Ichi the Killer: Episode 0
 Kakurenbo
 Joe vs. Joe
 Munto
 Munto 2: Beyond the Walls of Time
 Negadon: The Monster from Mars
 ShootFighter Tekken
 The Boy Who Wanted to be a Bear

Associate producer/Dubbing supervisor
 Angel Sanctuary
 Animation Runner Kuromi
 Armored Trooper Votoms
 Descendants of Darkness
 Detonator Orgun
 DNA^2
 Domain of Murder
 Gall Force 2: Revolution
 Gall Force 3: Destruction
 Gall Force: Earth Chapter
 Gall Force: New Era
 Garaga
 Geobreeders: Breakthrough
 Hades Project Zeorymer
 Harlock Saga
 Labyrinth of Flames
 Legend of Himiko
 Maetel Legend
 Maze
 Night on the Galactic Railroad
 Nightwalker
 Now and Then, Here and There
 Patlabor: The Mobile Police
 Patlabor: The TV Series
 Revolutionary Girl Utena
 RG Veda
 Rhea Gall Force
 Sohryuden: Legend of the Dragon Kings
 Tales of Seduction

Recording engineer 
 Arcade Gamer Fubuki
 Animation Runner Kuromi 2
 Gall Force 2: Destruction
 Gall Force 3: Stardust War
 Ichi the Killer: Episode 0
 Kakurenbo
 Joe vs. Joe
 Munto 2: Beyond the Walls of Time
 Negadon: The Monster from Mars
 ShootFighter Tekken
 The Boy Who Wanted to be a Bear

References

External links 
 
 
 Tom Wayland Interview at Anime Herald

American male voice actors
American voice directors
Living people
Place of birth missing (living people)
Tisch School of the Arts alumni
Year of birth missing (living people)